The Minister of Agriculture and Fisheries is a senior member of the Constitutional Government of East Timor heading the Ministry of Agriculture and Fisheries.

Functions
Under the Constitution of East Timor, the Minister has the power and the duty:

Where the Minister is in charge of the subject matter of a government statute, the Minister is also required, together with the Prime Minister, to sign the statute.

Incumbent
The incumbent Minister of Agriculture and Fisheries is Pedro dos Reis. He is assisted by Abílio Xavier de Araújo, Vice Minister of Agriculture and Fisheries, and Elídio de Araújo, Secretary of State for Fisheries.

List of Ministers 
The following individuals have been appointed as Minister of Agriculture and Fisheries under one or other of its two different titles:

References

External links

  – official site  

 

Agriculture and Fisheries